Thekkalur village is located in Avanashi Tehsil of Tiruppur district in Tamil Nadu, India.

External links
 Gandhi Nagar

Villages in Tiruppur district